PB-43 Quetta-VII is a constituency of the Provincial Assembly of Balochistan.

General elections 2013

General elections 2008
2008 Pakistani general election were held on 18 February 2008.

See also

 PB-42 Quetta-VI
 PB-44 Quetta-VIII

References

External links
 Election commission Pakistan's official website
 Awazoday.com check result
 Balochistan's Assembly official site

Constituencies of Balochistan